James Cornish Otis, Jr. (March 23, 1912 – March 15, 1993) was a justice of the Minnesota Supreme Court from 1961 to 1982. He was the father of Todd Otis, a member of the Minnesota Legislature.

References

Justices of the Minnesota Supreme Court
1912 births
1993 deaths
Place of birth missing
20th-century American judges